Gishi may refer to:
 Gishi, Nagorno-Karabakh, Artsakh
 Geshi, Deyr, Iran
 Gishi, Hormozgan, Iran
 Gishi, Isfahan, Iran